"Life Goes On" is a power ballad by American glam metal band Poison. It was the fourth single from their 1990 album Flesh & Blood.
The song reached number 35 on the Billboard Hot 100.

Song history

C.C. DeVille originally brought the song to the band, where Rikki Rockett and Bobby Dall added their input. The lyrics were written after a girlfriend of DeVille's was shot and killed in a bar fight in Palm Springs, California. The song is about trying to find the light at the end of the tunnel.

Albums
"Life Goes On" is on the following albums.

 Flesh & Blood
 Poison's Greatest Hits: 1986-1996
 Best of Ballads & Blues
 The Best of Poison: 20 Years of Rock
 Flesh & Blood - 20th Anniversary Edition
 Poison – Box Set (Collector's Edition)
 Double Dose: Ultimate Hits

Chart performance

References

 

1990 songs
1991 singles
Poison (American band) songs
Capitol Records singles
Song recordings produced by Bruce Fairbairn
Songs written by Bobby Dall
Songs written by C.C. DeVille
Songs written by Bret Michaels
Songs written by Rikki Rockett
Songs inspired by deaths
Glam metal ballads
Rock ballads